Johannes "Ryder" Mofokeng (26 January 1952 – 2 January 2021) was a South African football (soccer) defender who played for amateur club White City Lucky Brothers and Kaizer Chiefs.

Career

Youth career
At White City Lucky Brothers, he was a teammate of Webster Lichaba before he was invited to play for the Chiefs reserves in 1972.

Kaizer Chiefs
During the "Golden Era" he was assigned as captain by Eddie Lewis when he was 23. He was captain for 11 years and won 4 NPSL titles and a quadruple in 1981 with Jingles Pereira, Marks Maponyane, Abednigo Ngcobo, Nelson Dladla and Vusi Lamola and more. He scored one goal in his whole career.

After retirement
He was the Kaizer Chiefs manager with Nelson Dladla in 1993. After coaching he became the goalkeeper coach at the Chiefs youth academy. He died on January 2, 2021.

References

1952 births
2021 deaths
Sportspeople from Soweto
Kaizer Chiefs F.C. players
Association football defenders
South African soccer managers
South African soccer players